Nimesh Perera (born 9 January 1982) is a Sri Lankan cricketer. He made his first-class debut in 2001 and has played in 100 matches. He made his Twenty20 debut on 17 August 2004, for Tamil Union Cricket and Athletic Club in the 2004 SLC Twenty20 Tournament.

See also
 List of Chilaw Marians Cricket Club players

References

External links
 

1982 births
Living people
Sri Lankan cricketers
Antonians Sports Club cricketers
Burgher Recreation Club cricketers
Chilaw Marians Cricket Club cricketers
Galle Cricket Club cricketers
Tamil Union Cricket and Athletic Club cricketers
Cricketers from Colombo